John Massey is a former professional rugby league footballer who played in the late 1950s.

Playing career
John Massey scored a try in a trial game for Warrington under the assumed surname of "Johnson", he made his début for Warrington on Saturday 19 January 1957, he played his last match for Warrington on Saturday 26 January 1957.

References

External links
Search for "Massey" at rugbyleagueproject.org

Living people
English rugby league players
Place of birth missing (living people)
Rugby league five-eighths
Rugby league halfbacks
Warrington Wolves players
Year of birth missing (living people)